Sudagai Dam is a dam in Minakami, in the Gunma Prefecture of Japan. It supports a 44.8 MW hydroelectric power station.

References

Dams in Gunma Prefecture
Dams completed in 1955
1955 establishments in Japan